Kang is a Korean family name.  All together, the holders of this name number are 1,176,847 in South Korea, according to the 2015 national census, ranking 6th largest Korean family name.  While the name "Kang" can actually represent any of the 5 different hanja, or Chinese characters, the great majority  (more than 1 million) bear the surname 姜. The Chinese surname Jiāng also shares the same 姜 character.

Clans

Clans whose surname uses the Hanja character 姜 include the clans of Jinju and Geumcheon seat. The majority belong to the Jinju Kang clan (ko) (Hangul: 진주 강씨; Hanja: 晉州 姜氏) is said to be descended from Goguryeo commander Kang Isik. The Geumcheon Kang clan (ko) (Hangul: 금천 강씨; Hanja: 衿川 姜氏) is descended from an ancestors whose ancestral seat was Geumcheon, now part of Seoul.

Clans whose surname uses the Hanja character 康 include Sincheon (ko) and Yeonggang (ko). The Sincheon Kang clan is further subdivided into Goksan (ko) (Hangul: 곡산 강씨; Hanja: 谷山 康氏) and Jaeryeong (Hangul: 재령 강씨; Hanja: 載寧 康氏).

Notable individuals

Historic
Kang Yisik, Lord General and Military Official of the Kingdom of Goguryeo.
Kang Gamchan, Lord General and Military Official of Goryeo dynasty.
 Kang Jo (died 1010), general who served under Emperor Mokjong and Emperor Hyeonjong of Goryeo
Kang Hongrip, a military official of the Choson Dynasty.
 Kang Huian (1417?-1464), a prominent and painter of the early Choson period
 Kang Sehwang (1713–1791), a mayor of Hansung (now the capital city of Seoul), high government official and the Royal Representative Artist and Calligrapher in the mid-Choson dynasty.

Modern
 C.S. Eliot Kang, American diplomat and member of the U.S. Senior Executive Service
 Kang Chan-hee, South Korean singer, member of boy group SF9
 Kang Chang-hee, Speaker of the National Assembly of South Korea
 Kang Chang-gi, South Korean football midfielder
 Gaho (born Kang Dae-ho), South Korean singer, songwriter and producer
 Kang Daesung, South Korean singer, member of boy group Big Bang
 Kang Daniel, South Korean singer, former member of boy group Wanna One
 Dawon Kahng, Korean-American scientist, inventor of MOSFET
 Baekho (born Kang Dong-ho), South Korean singer, former member of boy group NU'EST
 Kang Dong-suk, South Korean violinist
 Kang Dong-suk, South Korean yachtsman
 Gang Dong-won, South Korean actor
 Emil Kang, Korean-American arts leader and Presidential appointee to the National Council on the Arts
 Kang Full (born Kang Do-young), South Korean webtoon artist
 Gang Gyeong-hyo, South Korean modern pentathlete
 Kang Han-na, South Korean actress
 Kang Ha-neul, South Korean actor
 Gary (born Kang Hee-gun), South Korean rapper, former member of hip hop duo Leessang
 Kang Ho-dong, South Korean entertainer
 Kang Hye-jung, South Korean actress
 Kang Hye-mi, South Korean volleyball player
 Kang Hye-won, South Korean singer, former member of girl group Iz*One
 Kino (born Kang Hyung-gu), South Korean singer, member of boy group Pentagon
 Kang Ji-hwan, South Korean actor
 Soyou (born Kang Ji-Hyun), South Korean singer, member of girl group Sistar
 Kang Ji-young, South Korean singer, member of girl group Kara
 Jung-ho Kang, baseball player
 Katherine Anna Kang, American video game designer and producer, machinima and documentary film maker
 Kang Kyung-ho, South Korean mixed martial artist
 Kang Kyung-wha, 38th Minister of Foreign Affairs of South Korea
 Kang Min, South Korean StarCraft player
 Kang Mi-na, South Korean singer, former member of girl groups I.O.I and Gugudan
 Kang Min-hyuk, South Korean drummer and actor, member of rock band CNBLUE
 Kang Min-hyuk, South Korean badminton player
 Kang Min-kyung, South Korean singer, member of pop duo Davichi
 Kang Nung-su, North Korean literary critic and politician
 Kang Ryang-uk, North Korean politician and a North Korean Protestant Minister and Chairman of the Christian Federation of Korea, deputy prime minister of North Korea and secretary of the Supreme People's Assembly
 Kang Seul-gi, South Korean singer, member of girl group Red Velvet
 Kang Seung-yoon, South Korean singer, member of boy group Winner
 Kang So-ra, South Korean actress 
 Sung Kang (born Kang Sung-ho), Korean-American actor 
 Kang Sung-hoon, South Korean singer, member of boy group Sechs Kies
 Kang Ye-seo, South Korean singer and actress, member of girl group Kep1er
 Kang Ye-won, South Korean actress
 Kang Yong-sop, chairman of the Korean Christian Federation and vice-president of the Korean Council of Religionists
 Young K (born Kang Young-hyun), South Korean singer, member of rock band Day6
 Kang Young-joong, chairman of Daekyo Group
 Kang Yu-chan, South Korean singer and actor, member of boy group A.C.E

See also
List of Korean family names
Korean name

References

External links
https://web.archive.org/web/20131009233626/http://kang.info/family/name/

Korean-language surnames
Surnames of Korean origin
vi:Khương (họ)
vi:Giang (họ)